The Reluctant Spy (also known as How to Be a Spy Without Even Trying) is a French-Italian spy-comedy film from 1963, directed by Jean-Charles Dudrumet, written by Michel Cousin, starring Jean Marais and Geneviève Page.

It is a parody of espionage films. It was followed by sequel Pleins feux sur Stanislas.

Plot
Stanislas Dubois is an ordinary businessman. When he meets a woman on a date in a restaurant, he takes off his coat. Upon leaving he confuses a similar coat with his own. Following this mix-up he becomes increasingly aware that something about him is attracting peculiar people. Hidden in his new coat is a microfilm which interests more than one secret service. After being drawn into the world of international espionage, a secret service of his own country hires him to lure enemy spies into a trap.

Cast 
 Jean Marais (Stanislas Evariste Dubois, director of an advertising agency)
 Geneviève Page (Ursula Keller, museum guide)
 Noël Roquevert (Inspector Mouton)
 Gaia Germani (Andrea, the female spokesman)
 Maurice Teynac (Alfred Thirios, the trafficker)
 Jean Galland (Colonel Derblay, press relations officer)
 Christian Marin (Lecanut, the secretary of Inspector Mouton)
 Mathilde Casadessus (Maria Linas, the diva)
 Marcelle Arnold (Miss Morin, the secretary of Stanislas)
 Hélène Dieudonné (grandmother of Stanislas)
 Germaine Dermoz (mother of Stanislas)
 Yvonne Clech (the lady on the train)
 Louis Arbessier (the museum director)
 Robert Rollis (mailman)
 Pierre Tornade (inspector)

References

External links 
 
 L’Honorable Stanislas, agent secret (1963) at the Films de France

1963 films
1960s spy comedy films
French spy comedy films
1960s French-language films
French black-and-white films
Films directed by Jean-Charles Dudrumet
Films scored by Georges Delerue
1963 comedy films
1960s French films